Callum Roberts is the name of:

Callum Roberts (biologist), British biologist
Callum Roberts (footballer), English footballer